The Lake Calls is a 1933 German drama film directed by Hans Hinrich and starring Heinrich George, Erika Helmke and Hans Mierendorff. It is based on the poem "Terje Vigen" by Henrik Ibsen. It was shot at the Terra Studios in Berlin and on location on the Danish island of Bornholm in the Baltic Sea. The film's sets were designed by the art directors Ernö Metzner and Erich Zander.

Cast
 Heinrich George as Terje Wiggen
 Erika Helmke as Antje, seine Frau
 Hans Mierendorff as Peters, Kapitän der 'Carola'
 Franz Stein as Der alte Jansen
 Herta Scheel as Frau Larsen
 Ludwig Andersen as Kommandant des Torpedobootes
 Ernst Busch as Besatzung der 'Carola'
 Josef Dahmen as Besatzung der 'Carola'
 Herbert Gernot as Besatzung der 'Carola'
 Otto Griese as Besatzung der 'Carola'
 Hans Kettler as Besatzung der 'Carola'
 Albert Florath
 Kurt Getke
 Charlie Kracker
 Otto Krone-Matzenauer
 Josef Peterhans
 Gustav Püttjer
 Arthur Reinhardt
 Herbert Schmidt
 Franz Sutton
 Ferdinand von Alten
 Roland von Rossi
 Franz Weber
 Walter Werner

References

Bibliography

External links 
 

1933 films
Films based on poems
Films based on works by Henrik Ibsen
Films of the Weimar Republic
1930s German-language films
Films directed by Hans Hinrich
1933 drama films
German drama films
German black-and-white films
1930s German films
Films shot at Terra Studios